American Writers: A Journey Through History is a series produced and broadcast by C-SPAN in 2001 and 2002 that profiled selected American writers and their times. Each program was a two- to three-hour look at the life and times of one or more significant American writer. Episodes were broadcast from locations of importance to the profiled writer(s) and featured interviews with historians and other experts. The series had an overall budget of $4,500,000. The first program aired on March 19, 2001, and focused on William Bradford and the Mayflower Compact.

Style
As is the case with many C-SPAN programs, it aired live and heavily incorporated calls from viewers:

"It's not perfectly packaged and beautifully produced," said Susan Swain, executive vice president of C-Span. "There isn't a narrator who weaves it together. It's a bit unpredictable. I don't know what my guests are going to say."

History of the show
Originally, the series was scheduled to air entirely in 2001, and it followed that schedule up to a profile of Will Rogers that aired on September 10, 2001. However, following the 9/11 attacks, C-SPAN management determined that the network needed to focus on events related to the attacks, and the subsequent programs were put on hold until March 2002. When originally planned, the profile of H.L. Mencken of Baltimore was scheduled to follow that of Will Rogers. Instead, C-SPAN producers opted to postpone the Mencken show, and return with one about the Harlem Renaissance, to honor the role of New York City in the 9/11 attacks. The series returned on March 31, 2002, opening with shots of 135th Street in Harlem, and continued through the final profile on July 7, 2002, which was a discussion with Neil Sheehan and David Halberstam at the Vietnam Veterans Memorial. The group of programs aired in 2002 were sometimes referred to as American Writers II: The 20th Century.

As a companion volume to the series, Merriam-Webster published the Dictionary of American Writers in 2001, which contained brief entries on a wide variety of writers, many of whom were not profiled in the series.

Selection criteria
The choice of which writers to profile was (by its very nature) subjective, unlike C-SPAN's similar 1999 series American Presidents: Life Portraits, because there were a fixed number of U.S. presidents but not a fixed number of American writers. For instance, Herman Melville was not profiled. There were also criticisms of the manner in which certain authors were presented, such as Ayn Rand.

The stated criteria for selection were the following:

"Writers whose works-–whether fiction or non-fiction, document or book–-chronicled, reflected upon, or influenced the course of our nation's history."
"Works which represent four centuries of American history, from the nation's founding to Vietnam."
"Writers who are essentially American."
"Writers whose works continue to be studied."
"An overall list which offers some demographic, cultural, and political diversity."
"Works which are generally available to the public."

Episodes
Programs were organized into eight chronological groups, shown below.

Note: In addition to the interviewees listed, each program featured a variety of other experts, many of whom were employed by or volunteered for the historical sites from which the programs were being broadcast.

I: Founding to Revolution, 1600–1800

II: The Young Nation, 1800–1850

III: Slavery & the Civil War, 1850–1865

IV: Rebuilding America & the Gilded Age, 1865–1901

V: Progressive Era & Reaction, 1901–1929

VI: Depression & War, 1929–1945

VII: Early Cold War, 1945–1961

VIII: Social Transformation to Vietnam, 1961–1975

References

External links 

C-SPAN original programming
2001 American television series debuts
2002 American television series endings
2000s American television talk shows